MHTML, an initialism of "MIME encapsulation of aggregate HTML documents", is a Web archive file format used to combine, in a single computer file, the HTML code and its companion resources (such as images) that are represented by external hyperlinks in the web page's HTML code. The content of an MHTML file is encoded using the same techniques that were first developed for HTML email messages, using the MIME content type multipart/related. MHTML files use an .mhtml or .mht filename extension.

The first part of the file is an e-mail header. The second part is normally HTML code. Subsequent parts are additional resources identified by their original uniform resource locators (URLs) and encoded in base64 binary-to-text encoding. MHTML was proposed as an open standard, then circulated in a revised edition in 1999 as RFC 2557.

The .mhtml (Web archive) and .eml (email) filename extensions are interchangeable: either filename extension can be changed from one to the other. An .eml message can be sent by e-mail, and it can be displayed by an email client. An email message can be saved using a .mhtml or .mht filename extension and then opened for display in a web browser or for editing other programs, including word processors and text editors.

Layout 
The header of an MHTML file contains metadata such as a date and time stamp, page title, the source URL, and a unique randomized boundary string for separating resources contained within the file. The boundary string is defined at the beginning and used throughout the file.

From: <Saved by Blink>
Snapshot-Content-Location: https://en.wikipedia.org/wiki/Smartphone
Subject: Smartphone - Wikipedia
Date: Sat, 24 Sep 2022 00:34:32 -0000
MIME-Version: 1.0
Content-Type: multipart/related;
        type="text/html";
        boundary="----MultipartBoundary--GsIBda0vjy2AKIAIliwl7JMwezXDRjDAsLje9khd5l----"

Then, the page resources are contained sequentially, starting with the page's rendered HTML source code. Each resource has its own metadata header which specifies its MIME type and the original location.

------MultipartBoundary--GsIBda0vjy2AKIAIliwl7JMwezXDRjDAsLje9khd5l----
Content-Type: text/html
Content-ID: <frame-D968CEC8BB7E60A1859261A8CA5DFB4D@mhtml.blink>
Content-Transfer-Encoding: binary
Content-Location: https://en.wikipedia.org/wiki/Smartphone

<!DOCTYPE html>

The MHTML file ends with a boundary string that is not followed by any data.

Browser support

Some browsers support the MHTML format, either directly or through third-party extensions, but the process for saving a web page along with its resources as an MHTML file is not standardized. Due to this, a web page saved as an MHTML file using one browser may render differently on another.

Internet Explorer
As of version 5.0, IE was the first browser to support reading and saving web pages and external resources to a single MHTML file.

Microsoft Edge
As of switching to the Chromium source code, Edge supports saving as MHTML.

Opera
Support for saving web pages as MHTML files was made available in the Opera 9.0 web browser. From Opera 9.50 through the rest of the Presto-based Opera product line (currently at Opera 12.16 as of 19 July 2013), the default format for saving pages is MHTML. The initial release of the new Webkit/Blink-based Opera (Opera 15) did not support MHTML, but subsequent releases (Opera 16 onwards) do.

MHTML can be enabled by typing "opera://flags#save-page-as-mhtml" at the address bar.

Google Chrome 
Creating MHTML files in Google Chrome is enabled by default in version 86.

Yandex Browser 
Creating MHTML (multipart/related) files in Yandex Browser is enabled by default in version 22.7.4.960 (July 2022).

Vivaldi 
Similarly to Google Chrome, the Chromium-based Vivaldi browser can save webpages as MHTML files since the 2.3 release.

It supports both reading and writing MHTML files by toggling the "vivaldi://flags/#save-page-as-mhtml" option.

Firefox 
Mozilla Firefox does not support MHTML. Until the advent of version 57 ("Firefox Quantum"), MHT files could be read and written by installing a browser extension, such as Mozilla Archive Format or UnMHT.

Safari 
From version 3.1.1 onwards, Apple Inc.'s Safari web browser does not natively support the MHTML format.  Instead, Safari supports the webarchive format, and the macOS version includes a print-to-PDF feature.

As with most other modern web browsers, support for MHTML files can be added to Safari via various third-party extensions.

Konqueror 
As of version 3.5.7, KDE's Konqueror web browser does not support MHTML files. An extension project, mhtconv, can be used to allow saving and viewing of MHTML files.

ACCESS NetFront
NetFront 3.4 (on devices such as the Sony Ericsson K850) can view and save MHTML files.

Pale Moon
Pale Moon requires an extension to be installed to read and write MHT files.  One extension is freely available, MozArchiver, a fork of Mozilla Archive Format extension.

GNOME Web 
GNOME Web added support for read and save web pages in MHTML since version 3.14.1 released in September 2014.

MHT viewers 
There are commercial software products for viewing MHTML files and converting them to other formats, such as PDF and ePub. Some HTML editor programs can view and edit MHTML files.

MIME type
MIME type for MHTML is not well agreed upon. Used MIME types include:
 multipart/related
 application/x-mimearchive
 message/rfc822

Other apps

Problem Steps Recorder 
Problem Steps Recorder for Windows can save its output to MHT format.

Save to Google Drive extension 
The "Save to Google Drive" extension for Google Chrome can save as MHTML as one of its outputs.

Microsoft OneNote
Microsoft OneNote, starting with OneNote 2010, emails individual pages as .mht files.

Evernote
Evernote for Windows can export notes as MHT format, as an alternative to HTML or its own native .enex format.

Exploits 
In May 2015, a researcher noted that attackers could build malicious documents by creating an MHT file, appending an MSO object at the end (MSO is a file format used by the Microsoft Outlook e-mail application), and renaming the resulting file with a .doc extension. The delivery method would be by spam emails.

In April 2019, a security researcher published details about an XML external entity (XXE) vulnerability that could be exploited when a user opens an MHT file. Since the Windows operating system is set to automatically open all MHT files, by default, in Internet Explorer, the exploit could be triggered when a user double-clicked on a file that they received via email, instant messaging, or another vector, including a different browser.

See also 
 data URI scheme
 Mozilla Archive Format
 Mpack (Unix)
 Webarchive
 Web ARChive

References

External links
 MHTML standard explained
 RFC 2557 (1999)—MIME Encapsulation of Aggregate Documents, such as HTML (MHTML)
 RFC 2110 (1997, Obsolete)—MIME E-mail Encapsulation of Aggregate Documents, such as HTML (MHTML)

Archive formats
Internet Explorer
HTML
MIME
Web Archives